This is a list of international television series which debuted, or were scheduled to debut, on Australian television in 2010. The list is arranged chronological order. Where more than one program debuted on the same date, those programs are listed alphabetically.

Premieres

Free-to-air television

Subscription television

References

Premieres